The Greyhound Bus Museum is located in Hibbing, Minnesota, United States, where Carl Wickman and Andrew "Bus Andy" Anderson started their first bus service in 1914 transporting fellow miners in a 1914 Hupmobile.

Company history
The Greyhound Lines was created by E.C.(Ed) Ekstrom, Carl Wickman, Andy (Bus) Anderson, and others, through a series of partnerships and mergers to become an icon, symbolizing the American dream.

Museum history
The museum opened in September 1989 in the Hibbing Municipal Building under the name Greyhound Bus Origin Center. It was the dedicated work of one man, Gene Nicolelli, a local resident, who found a plaque in the abandoned local Greyhound Terminal honoring the town as the birthplace of the bus industry. The museum has since acquired a number of buses associated with the Greyhound Line operation. The exhibits also tell the story of the company, its contribution to the World War II efforts and display memorabilia from its history.

Historical vehicles

Permanent exhibits
 The men and machines that created Greyhound Bus Lines: Pictorial and memorabilia
 The Greyhound Story: Video presentation of the company history.
 The car they could not sell: The story of entrepreneurship from a 2-mile line Hibbing-Alice to the world's largest bus company.

See also
 First Avenue, a nightclub that currently operates out of a former Greyhound Bus Terminal in Minneapolis, Minnesota.

References

External links
 Museum home page
 Bluehounds and Redhounds, the histories of Greyhound and Trailways

Bus museums
Greyhound Lines
Museums in St. Louis County, Minnesota
Transportation museums in Minnesota
Buildings and structures in Hibbing, Minnesota
Museums established in 1989
1989 establishments in Minnesota